The Red Hill railway line in Melbourne, Australia, was a rural railway branching off from the Stony Point railway line at Bittern. The line had a fairly short life, opening on 2 December 1921 and closing on 1 July 1953.

Current status
The line was dismantled some time after it was closed, and most of the line from Bittern to Merricks is now on private property, while the right-of-way from Merricks to Red Hill remains, having been converted to a shared use rail trail.

Station histories

References

Closed Melbourne railway lines
5 ft 3 in gauge railways in Australia
Railway lines opened in 1921
Railway lines closed in 1953
1921 establishments in Australia
1953 disestablishments in Australia